Apocellus is a genus of spiny-legged rove beetles in the family Staphylinidae. There are about 11 described species in Apocellus.

Species
These 11 species belong to the genus Apocellus:
 Apocellus analis LeConte, 1877
 Apocellus andinus
 Apocellus bicolor Casey, 1885
 Apocellus brevipennis Casey, 1885
 Apocellus cognatus Sharp, 1887
 Apocellus crassicornis Casey, 1885
 Apocellus gracilicornis Casey, 1885
 Apocellus niger Casey, 1886
 Apocellus sphaericollis (Say, 1831)
 Apocellus stilicoides LeConte, 1877
 Apocellus ustulatus Erichson, 1840

References

Further reading

External links

 

Oxytelinae
Articles created by Qbugbot